The 1986 United States Senate election in Washington was held on November 3, 1986. Incumbent Republican U.S. Senator Slade Gorton ran for re-election, but was defeated by former Transportation Secretary Brock Adams. However, Gorton would later be returned to Washington's other Senate seat in 1988.

Blanket primary

Candidates

Democratic 
 Brock Adams, former U.S. Secretary of Transportation
 Orin O. Osborn
 James Sherwood Stokes

Republican 
 Slade Gorton, incumbent U.S. Senator
 George Campbell
 Ted Parker Fix

Washington Taxpayer 
 Jill Fein

Results

General election

Candidates 
 Brock Adams (D), former U.S. Secretary of Transportation
 Slade Gorton (R), incumbent U.S. Senator

Results

See also 
 1986 United States Senate elections

References 

Washington
1986
1986 Washington (state) elections